Sümer is a Turkish name. Notable people with the name include:

Surname
 Adalet Sümer (1929–2020), Turkish novelist and playwright
 Cevdet Sümer (1922–?), Turkish equestrian
 Fahri Sümer (born 1958), Turkish boxer
 Özkan Sümer (1940–2020), Turkish football player and coach

Given name
 Sümer Koçak (1961–2020), Turkish wrestler
 Sümer Tilmaç (1948–2015), Turkish actor

See also
 Sümer, Mardin, a town in Dargeçit district of Mardin Province, Turkey
 Sumer (disambiguation)

Turkish masculine given names
Turkish-language surnames